Alarm für Cobra 11 – Die Autobahnpolizei ("Alarm for Cobra 11 – The Highway Police") is a long-running, popular German television series about a two-man team of highway police (Autobahnpolizei), originally set in Berlin and since 1999 in the area of Cologne. The series has been broadcast in 120 countries worldwide.

The last regular episode "Das Team" aired on 12 August 2021. In an interview, main star Erdoğan Atalay blamed the stoppage on COVID-19 pandemic. In 2022, the series will return in the form of 90-minute TV movies.

Plot

The tasks of the Cobra 11 team consist primarily in solving crimes and catching the perpetrators. Typical elements of the action genre are mixed, so that there are regular car crashes, shootouts, explosions and fistfights. These action scenes are elaborately produced in most cases, and appropriately presented in a spectacular way. The high number of unrealistic scenes is a common criticism of the series; for example, large explosions often happen after small collisions while people emerge unharmed out of cars which have sustained catastrophic damage.

Stunts
The series is known for its extremely well performed stuntwork, which features the destruction of various vehicles in every episode. Almost every episode has a distinct structure, with at least one daring action sequence and the pre-title sequence usually consisting of the main event (i.e. a devastating crash on the Autobahn). The stuntwork is often so spectacular that it would not look out of place in a full-fledged movie, with cars commonly reaching implausible heights as they vault through the air.

Production locations

From 1996 to 1998, the series was produced jointly (responsible for all other production aspects such as filming/postproduction/location scouting etc.) and ActionConcept (stunts).  Those episodes were shot in Berlin, notably in the site of the former Checkpoint Bravo and in the surrounding state of Brandenburg. In 1998, Action Concept took over as the sole production company and shifted all filming/production work to its headquarters in Hürth just south of Cologne.  Since then, episodes have been shot in and around Cologne and Düsseldorf as well as on several major Autobahnen (A540/A44 and now mainly on the Filmautobahn Aldenhoven near Düren – ) between Cologne and Düsseldorf in the state of North Rhine-Westphalia (NRW).

Cast

Main

Johannes Brandrup as Detective Chief Inspector Frank Stolte (main: season 1; guest: season 22)
Rainer Strecker as Detective Chief Inspector Ingo Fischer (season 1)
Erdoğan Atalay as Detective Chief Superintendent Semir Gerkhan (season 1-present)
Almut Eggert as Police Chief Katharina Lamprecht (season 1; recurring season 2)
Mark Keller as Detective Chief Inspector André Fux (main: seasons 2–4; guest: season 19)
René Steinke as Detective Chief Inspector Tom Kranich (seasons 5–8, 10–12)
Christian Oliver as Detective Inspector Jan Richter (seasons 9–10)
Gedeon Burkhard as Detective Chief Inspector Chris Ritter (seasons 12–13)
Tom Beck as Detective Chief Inspector Ben Jäger (seasons 14–19; guest: season 25)
Vinzenz Kiefer as Detective Chief Inspector Alex Brandt (seasons 19–21)
Daniel Roesner as Detective Chief Inspector Paul Renner (season 21–25)
Pia Stutzenstein as Detective Inspector Vicky Reisinger (season 25-present)
Katja Woywood as Police Chief Kim Krüger (season 21–25; recurring seasons 14–25)
Katrin Heß as Detective Sergeant Jenny Dorn (season 21–25; recurring seasons 16–21)
Niels Kurvin as CSU Hartmud Freund (season 21-present; recurring seasons 9-21)
Daniela Wutte as Secretary Susanne König (season 21–25; recurring seasons 12–21)

Recurring
Dietmar Huhn as Officer III Horst Herzberger (season 2–16). An older police officer and good friend of Semir's, until he was killed in the line of duty.
Gottfried Vollmer as Officer III Dieter Bonrath (season 3–17). Horst's partner with a teenage son. Also killed in the line of duty.
Carina Wiese as Andrea Gerkhan (née Schäfer). She was the precinct's secretary before becoming Semir's wife and the mother of his two younger daughters (season 2–14, 16-present).
Gizem Emre as Dana Gerkhan (née Wegener), a police officer and Semir's illegitimate daughter (season 19-present). Tesha Moon Krieg played her as a child in season 16.

Episodes

Preamble
 The opening titles of the first 158 episodes (1996-2006) had the following preamble:

Ihr Revier ist die Autobahn (Their precinct is the autobahn)
Ihr Tempo ist mörderisch (They work at break-neck speed)
Ihre Gegner: Autoschieber, Mörder und Erpresser (They're up against car thieves, killers, and extortionists)
Einsatz rund um die Uhr für die Männer von Cobra 11 (They're on call around the clock: the men of Cobra 11)
Unsere Sicherheit ist ihr Job (Our safety is their job).

 During Episodes 159-243 (2007-2012), the preamble was:

Ihr Revier ist die Autobahn (Their precinct is the autobahn)
Ihr Einsatz heißt: volles Tempo (Their mission: full speed)
Ihre Gegner von heute: extrem schnell und gefährlich (Their enemies today: extremely fast and dangerous)
Verbrechen ohne Limit – Jeder Einsatz volles Risiko (Crimes without limit – every job at full risk)
für die Männer von Cobra 11 (for the men of Cobra 11).

 Since Episode 244 (2013), the preamble was:

Ihr Revier ist die Autobahn. (Their precinct is the autobahn)
Ihre Gegner: extrem schnell und gefährlich. (Their enemies: Extremely quick and dangerous) 
Verbrechen ohne Limit. (Crimes without limit) 
Jeder Einsatz - volles Risiko (Every job: at full risk)
für die Männer von Cobra 11. (for the men of Cobra 11)

 From 2014 to 2019, the preamble was:

Ihr Revier ist die Autobahn. (Their precinct is the autobahn)
Ihre Gegner: extrem schnell und gefährlich. (Their enemies: Extremely quick and dangerous) 
Volles Risiko (Extremely risky)
für die Männer von Cobra 11. (for the men of Cobra 11)

Episode 365 onwards features an all-new variation of the theme song, but lacks any opening preamble.

International broadcasters
: 1TV (Yak TV)
: SBS2
: ORF
: AB3
: Band
: Diema, Nova
: Séries+
: La Red
: CCTV
: RTL Televizija
: TV Nova, Nova Action
: RedTeleSistema
: TV6, TV3
: MTV3
: TF1, Télé Monte Carlo
: RTL Television, RTL Crime, RTL Nitro
: RTL Klub, Cool TV, Sorozat+, RTL+, Paramount Channel
: BIG RTL Thrill
: Tehran TV, IRIB Tamasha
: Rai 2, AXN
: AAB, ATV, Fox Classics, Hokkaido Cultural Broadcasting, KBS, Nippon BS Broadcasting, Sun TV, TeNY, Tokyo MX, TV Asahi, TV-U Yamagata
: TV3, TV6
: LRT televizija, TV3, TV6, BTV
: The Film Zone
: SBN TV
: RTL 7, RTL 4
: Телевизија Телма, Сител Телевизија
: TVN 7, TELE 5, Stopklatka, TV Puls
: RTP1, AXN
: Pro Cinema, AXN
: СТС, Рен ТВ
: TLC
: Prva Srpska Televizija
: Markíza
: Kanal A
: KykNET (Dubbed in Afrikaans)
: CNTV (2003-2005), SCREEN (2012)
: Cuatro, AXN, Energy
: Kanal A, Kanal D, TV8, tv2, Olay TV, Beyaz TV, Ege TV, Abant TV, TV41
: Новий канал, 2+2, Уніан
: V-me (dubbed in Spanish)
: ANTV

Legacy

Game adaptations
The series has also spawned numerous game releases in Europe, primarily for PC, but they have generally met with mixed receptions. The latest title is Crash Time 5: Undercover. Crash Time was also dubbed into English and sold in many other markets worldwide.

Spin-off

In 2002, a spin-off named  (Alarm for Cobra 11 – Team Mission 2) was started. Because of its limited success, only two seasons were produced.

Parodies
The segments feature the team talking in exaggerated Turkish accents and many references to Döner Kebab. Erdoğan Atalay and René Steinke themselves have made cameo appearances in some.
The series has also been parodied on Switch TV and Switch reloaded.
 Alarm für Cobra 11 – Die Autobahnpolizei was also parodied in the Latvian comedy show Savādi gan.

World's Wildest Police Videos
Some of the clips from season 1 to season 5 were used as crash test footage in World's Wildest Police Videos, alongside Der Clown and one crash from Die Wache.

References

External links
 Official RTL site
 Official Italian Fan Club ** Squadra Speciale Cobra11
 Alarm für Cobra 11-Spoiler
 Fernsehserien
 Alarm für Cobra 11 - Spoiler / News
 The official German Fanclub of Alarm for Cobra 11
 Alarm fur Cobra 11 Episode Videos 
 First Official German Erdoğan Atalay-Fanpage (English version, many translated interviews)
 Alerta Cobra official information page at United States broadcaster V-me
 
 The Number 1 Fanpage of Alarm for Cobra 11 in 3 languages

1996 German television series debuts
1990s German television series
2000s German television series
2010s German television series
2020s German television series
German crime television series
German drama television series
RTL (German TV channel) original programming
German action television series
Television shows set in Berlin
Television shows set in North Rhine-Westphalia
German-language television shows
1990s German police procedural television series
2000s German police procedural television series
2010s German police procedural television series
2020s German police procedural television series